The 1933 season of Auckland Rugby League was its 25th. The championship was won by Devonport United. This was their fifth title having previously won it in 1913, 1914, 1928 and 1932. The first two titles were prior to their merger with the nearby Sunnyside club when they were known as North Shore Albions, a name they later reverted to. They finished 1 point ahead of runner up Marist Old Boys. Devonport also won the Stormont Shield for the third time following victories in 1930 and 1931. They defeated Richmond Rovers in the final by 12 points to 7. Richmond had gained their place in the Stormont Shield match by winning the Roope Rooster with wins over Newton (29–15), Marist Old Boys (10–0), and City Rovers in the final by 26 points to 14. This was Richmond's third Roope Rooster title following wins in 1926 and 1927. Marist were awarded the Thistle Cup for the most competition points scored in the second round.

The Challenge Round trophy (awarded to the team with the best second round competition points) was won by the much improved Newton Rangers after they beat all 5 senior opponents. The Max Jaffe Cup was won by Richmond who defeated Marist comfortably by 31 to 8, and in a charity match to conclude the season Marist reversed this result with a 16 to 5 win over Richmond.

In reserve and lower grade competitions Richmond once again shone. The senior reserve competition was won by Richmond Rovers Reserves who finished with a 6 win, 2 draw, 2 loss record. While Devonport United Reserves won the reserve grade knockout competition when they defeated Richmond 5 to 4 in the final. Richmond once again won the Davis Shield with their lower grade teams combining for more competition points than any other club. This was their 11th win in the 13 years that it has been awarded.

It was a busy season for the Auckland representative side. They played seven matches for six wins and one loss. Their sole loss came against the South Auckland (Waikato) side who beat them 14–0 at Carlaw Park. Auckland had revenge in their final representative match of the season this time beating South Auckland by 17 points to 5. Their other wins came over Taranaki (32–20 and 25–17), North Auckland (28–13), West Coast (28–22), and Hawke's Bay (47–17).

Auckland Rugby League meetings 
George Rhodes announced his resignation of the chairmanship due to business commitments which would require him leaving Auckland regularly. He died suddenly near the end of the season and was buried at Waikumete Cemetery. His successor was Mr. G, Grey Campbell, who was a well known member of the City Council, the Transport Board, and other institutions. Rhodes had been chairman of the league for six and a half years. Mr. R. Doble said Mr. Rhodes deserved to be honoured with life membership for his many years service. This was endorsed by several members. Rhodes started out as a groundsman at Carlaw Park in 1921 before becoming the ground superintendent. At the league AGM it was reported that revenue for the year totalled £2,573, of which £1,791 came from gate receipts, £416 from ground rents, £68 from advertising and £45 from subscriptions. The profit was £754 9/3, with £572 1/3 distributed in grant to clubs. After other spending the total profit for the year was £182 8/. J. Carlaw presided over the meeting where over 100 people were in attendance. Mr. J. B. Donald was elected patron, Mr. J. F. W. Dickson was elected vice-president. At the ARL Board of Control meeting prior to the commencement of the season the chairman Mr. G. Grey Campbell said the policy of granting gate percentages to senior clubs should be retained. He said that it was up to the clubs to produce a high standard of play and the percentage to senior clubs would be an incentive.

Near the conclusion of the season the Auckland Rugby League met and Mr. Campbell said “the gate receipts to date had been in excess of those last season. Clubs had benefited considerably from the percentage granted, and most senior clubs were now in a position to assist their players next season”. The intention was to carefully manage the finances of the league and “to improve the stand accommodation and give players better dressing facilities”.

The New Zealand Herald printed an article ‘reviewing’ the season where they wrote of the visiting St George team and the standard of play in Auckland. They also discussed the possibility of Auckland teams touring Australia.

Junior management meeting 
At the annual general meeting of the Auckland Rugby League Junior Management Committee on 21 March the annual report (in reference to the 1932 season) was submitted. It stated that there were 1,008 registered players compared with 1,224 the previous season, and 63 teams took the field. The reason for the decline in numbers was put down to the fact that large numbers of people had left Auckland in search of work during the trying economic times. The report then went on to congratulate teams who had won various trophies in the Junior grades in the 1932 season.

Senior competition 
It was decided prior to the season that the reserve grade games would be played before their respective senior teams. This had been requested by clubs as it would help them ensure they had players available for their top side at all times. In spite of this there were no changes ultimately made at all to the scheduling with all senior matches played at Carlaw Park apart from rare exceptions. One reserve grade match was played at Carlaw Park most weekends with the other matches usually played at the nearby Auckland Domain.

The Auckland Rugby League decided at a meeting following the first round of the Roope Rooster competition that a new competition for senior teams spread over 5 weeks would take place. With the senior competition having reverted to 6 teams 2 seasons earlier the round robin was over relatively quickly leaving more time later in the season than had previously existed. The matches were to be unique in that they would be of 40 minutes duration with no interval. Most weeks two of the games would be played prior to an inter-provincial match. In the event of a tie the team that had the best for and against record would be declared the winners and a special trophy would be awarded.

It was also decided that force downs in teams own in goal and kicks that went dead in goal would be worth points in order to speed up the games. These rules were used in an annual competition in Sydney when there were no representative games on. Newton ultimately won this round and it was a key factor in them being given the opportunity to play against the touring St George team.

St George tour 
In September the St George team from Sydney toured the upper North Island. St George had finished runner up in the 1933 NSWRFL. Their first match was against the Auckland champion Devonport United team who they defeated 19–8. They then played a midweek match with Richmond Rovers who they lost to 8–13 and then Marist Old Boys who they also lost to 11–25.

Following this they departed on a tour of Rotorua to see the geothermal sites before playing South Auckland in Huntly where they won by 17 points to 5. They then travelled to New Plymouth where they had a 22 points to 14 win over Taranaki.

St George returned to Auckland to complete their tour where they played Newton Rangers in a midweek match which they won 30 points to 23, followed by a return match with Richmond on the Saturday. There had been some debate as to who the last match would be played against. Newton had had a solid season putting in some strong performances and they were arguably the most improved side in Auckland. They had also been the first club to request a match with the touring side however the strongest performing sides had all been matched up with St George first and this last match of the tour was only confirmed at the end of the tour. Following the match with Newton the St George team was entertained by the New Zealand Rugby League at a dinner. Tribute was paid to the “sporting spirit” that the team had shown and a “hand-some engraved shield” was presented to the team by H Wamsley who had made it himself. The shield was to be played for in an annual competition between clubs from Sydney and the Auckland Province. Whilst in Auckland several members of the team along with the manager Mr. J. H. Mostyn visited Sacred Heart College where Mr. Mostyn gave an address to the students on football. Following their last match the team departed for Sydney on the Wanganella Ship at 5pm which meant that the match with Richmond kicked off at the earlier time of 2:45pm. Richmond won the match by 5 points to 3. Prior to the match a running race was held between Len Brennan and Bernard Martin of the touring side and several members of local clubs. It was run from try line to try line and Martin won the race by a foot from Adams (Devonport) in a time of 12.15 seconds with Brennan finishing third. Brennan was killed ten years later in 1943 when the plane he was in was shot down over Italy during World War II.

Tour matches

Carlaw Park 
At a meeting of the Auckland Rugby League in the week prior to the start of the season there were several suggestions put forward in regard to Carlaw Park. These were, that the No. 2 ground be available for practice regardless “of the weather, that the stone wall at the end of No. 2 ground beside the terraces should be covered to protect players; that the scoreboard should be raised; that people should be stopped from jumping the terrace fence at the conclusion of the main match; that the transport Board be asked to extend the penny section from the railway station to the Stanley Street stop...”. It was also decided to issue tickets for the admission of unemployed to Carlaw Park, with the official co-operation of the Auckland Provincial Unemployed Association. After it was found that this system was being abused with the tickets being on sold it was decided to charge the unemployed but at a reduced rate of sixpence. Those trying to enter under this system had to produce their unemployment levy book containing an official stamp and a special turn-style was to be used to admit them. All school children up to 14 years of age would be admitted for free.

In early August it was reported that the overhead bridge from Stanley Street to Carlaw Park would be completed by Saturday, 5 August.

As was often the case at Carlaw Park numerous events were held there in the rugby league off season. A whippet race meeting was held in early December along with cycling races, while on 15 December there was a sports carnival involving cycling, running, and wood chopping events. The wood chopping featured W. M. Johnstone, the champion tree-feller of Australia, and New Zealand's D. Hoey, who was "recognised as one of the World's best". The results of the various competitions were published in the Auckland Star.

Rule issues 
At a meeting of the Auckland Rugby League Referees Association on 29 May they decided to recommend to the Board of Control that referees put the ball into the scrum at all grade matches, which was something that had been tried out unsuccessfully 6 years earlier. It was felt that “scrummaging was not satisfactory, particularly with regard to hooking and other infringements around the scrum”. Matches on 2 June featured this new rule change and it was commentated from referees that it had so far improved play around scrums and eliminated a lot of whistle. It was however decided at a meeting of the New Zealand Council several weeks later that the practice was to be discontinued after acting on the recommendation of the New Zealand Referees’ Association. It was also noted that a player when falling on the ball in the in goal area needed to ground the ball with their hands and it was play on until this was done so. The play the ball rule was said to be being better controlled with the “same command as evident in a boxing match, when a referee called ‘break’ and the contenders were bound to obey”.

The League Council advised that the forward pass rule was being ruled incorrectly with players being penalised for being offside when receiving a forward pass. As the players had inadvertently got in front of the teammate passing the ball it was clarified that it should be considered a forward pass only and therefore a scrum rather than a penalty. The board approved of this interpretation and referred it to the Referees’ Association.

Radio coverage of matches 
The Auckland Rugby League decided to forward a motion of protest from Ted Phelan to the New Zealand Government regarding the ban on the 1ZR station. The speaker said that patients at the Evelyn Firth Home and Auckland Hospital “were strong in their protest against being denied the privilege of listening to the station”.

Midweek competition revived 
After not being played in 1932 the midweek business league competitions returned with eight teams competing with matches held at Carlaw Park. They were Amalgamated Theatres A, Amalgamated Theatres B, Atta Taxis, Checker Taxis, City Markets, Railway, Seamen United, Victoria United. The competition consisted of two rounds, though the second round would be a knockout competition. Ponsonby and Richmond wrote to Auckland Rugby League objecting to any of their players playing for the midweek teams as it would risk their health for the weekend matches. City and Marist supported the objection. The league decided that no senior or reserve grade players could take part in the competition unless they had the permission of the clubs and the Wednesday management group be advised of this decision. This rule was somewhat ignored however and “two prominent players were injured... in mid-week matches and were not available for Saturday's games”. The league decided to enforce the rule that permission must by granted from senior clubs before players were allowed to participate in the mid-week competition.

Auckland Rugby League prize giving 
In a break from previous years where trophies and awards were handed out at the beginning of the following season it was decided to hold the ceremony at the conclusion of the current season. The event was held at the Manchester Unity Hall on 31 October with free admission and an open invitation. Trophies were presented to teams as follows:

Senior grade – Fox Memorial Shield (Devonport United), Stormont Shield (Devonport United), Roope Rooster and Max Jaffe Cup (Richmond Rovers), Special Challenge Round (Newton Rangers)
Senior reserve championship – (Richmond Rovers), Knockout (Devonport United)
Second Grade – Wright Cup (Mangere), Knockout Foster Shield (Mangere)
Third Grade Open – Hayward Shield (Marist Old Boys
Third Grade Intermediate – Walker Cup (Northcote Ramblers), and Knockout Murray Cup (Northcote Ramblers) The undefeated Northcote team were photographed and published in the Auckland Star 
Fourth Grade – Hospital Cup (Marist Old Boys)
Fifth Grade – Endean Shield (Richmond Rovers)
Sixth Grade – Rhodes Shield (Devonport United), Knockout Hammill Cup (Otahuhu Rovers)
Seventh Grade – Myers Cup (Richmond Rovers)
Primary Schools Competition – Championship Walmsley Shield (Avondale), Knockout Davis Cup (Ellerslie)

With Richmond Rovers winning the Davis Point Shield for the highest number of points scored by any club in all junior grades.

Obituaries

George Frederick Iles
George Frederick Iles passed away aged 39 in Tauranga on 27 March 1933. He was born in Christchurch before moving to Auckland at the age of 18. He played for the Grafton Athletic side in 1915–16 and then for Newton Rangers in 1916–19. He also represented Auckland and New Zealand in the post war period before moving to Tauranga in 1920 to establish a wool and hide export business. He made an attempt to establish rugby league in the Tauranga area but it was short lived and he largely played rugby union where he represented Bay of Plenty against the Springboks in 1921. Iles was also a prominent sprinter, winning races in the North and South Islands. He was survived by his widow and two young sons.

George Rhodes
Mr. George Rhodes, former chairman of Auckland Rugby League passed away suddenly on 17 September at Auckland Hospital at the age of 68. He was chairman from 1926 to 1932 and had spent many years at Carlaw Park prior to this as an official on the grounds committee. He had been succeeded by Mr. G. Grey Campbell (the chairman in 1933). He was buried at Waikumete Cemetery where the funeral service was held with a “lengthy cortege of motor vehicles” following the casket. A large number of Auckland Rugby League officials were present, along with representatives from each of the senior clubs. His coffin was draped with the Auckland Rugby League flag.

Senior grade competitions

Fox Memorial standings 
{|
|-
|

Fox Memorial fixtures

Round 1
Future New Zealand representative Alf Mitchell, who was the first ever Samoan to play for New Zealand (in 1935), was knocked unconscious in his first ever game for Richmond. He was taken to Auckland Hospital and didn't reappear in their first grade side until round 5. He had moved to New Zealand from the Pacific Islands in 1928 aged about 18, and was educated at Feilding High School before moving to Auckland in the early 1930s. Ex-New Zealand representative Maurice Wetherill made his debut as a first grade referee in Newton's match with Richmond. Bill (Rauaroa Tangaroapeau) Turei scored his first try for City. He was killed in 1944 fighting in World War 2. A Nathan, a North Auckland rugby representative was also on debut for Newton.

Round 2

Round 3
Frank Delgrosso was injured in a tackle in the second half when Ponsonby led 5–3. He was forced from the field and announced his retirement as a result. He had played 15 seasons for Ponsonby and over 180 matches, a record at the time.

Round 4

Round 5
A Nathan was ordered off for Newton for striking a Ponsonby player.

Round 6
Horatio Drew for City Rovers was knocked unconscious when he was tackled and was taken to Auckland Hospital in a St John Ambulance. His condition was reported as being satisfactory by the NZ Herald the following day. F Herring also left the field injured.

Round 7
Dick Smith and Albert Laing both left the field injured in the second half leaving Devonport with just 11 players against Marist. While Newton suffered the same fate with Ted Brimble and Cameron colliding. Cameron went off while Brimble hobbled around for the rest of the match after his knee was kicked in the collision. Neither was able to play the following week.

Round 8
The win for Marist over Ponsonby was significant for the club in that it was their 100th first grade win in their 15th season in the first grade competition.

Round 9
The 50 points that City scored in their Round 9 match against Ponsonby was the fourth time that a senior team had hit the 50 point mark in Fox Memorial history to this point. On all four occasions the team to do so was City. In 1920 they defeated Grafton Athletic 66–13, in 1921 they beat Fire Brigade 61–7, and in 1925 they defeated Athletic 57–7.

Round 10

Roope Rooster knockout competition 
Auckland Rugby League made the decision to expand the Roope Rooster somewhat by allowing the leading teams from the South Auckland competition to enter it. Taupiri and Huntly were both drawn to play in the first round against Richmond and Marist respectively. Both Taupiri and Huntly both withdrew from their matches in the days leading up to their matches forcing an emergency committee to redraw the first round matches. The competition took a further hit when the entire first round was postponed due to poor weather. Not only were all the league fixtures not played but all rugby matches also were postponed as was the horse racing at Ellerslie Racecourse.

The Ponsonby match with Marist was played at Sturges Park in Otahuhu as a way of promoting rugby league in the area with a charge being made at the ground to gain funds.

Bert Cooke turned out for Richmond for the first time in the season against Newton Rangers in Round 1 of the Roope Rooster after returning to Auckland from Waihou where he had been working.

City received a bye after their victory in the first round with Marist and Richmond playing in the semi final. A percentage of the gate takings from the match would go towards the Auckland Ladies’ Hockey Association which they would put towards the cost of sending a representative ladies team on tour.

Round 1
Brian Riley scored his first ever try for Ponsonby. He had played one match earlier in the season on July 1 after being promoted from their reserve side. He was aged just 18 and would play for New Zealand just 2 years later.

Semi final

Final
The final also doubled as their round 1 match in the Challenge Round.

Challenge round 
The final of the Roope Rooster doubled as a Challenge Round match as well between Richmond Rovers and City Rovers. The other 1st round matches were played on the same day. The match between Newton and Ponsonby which resulted in the unusual score of 1–0 to Newton was protested by Ponsonby. The competition was being played under altered rules with matches lasting just 40 minutes and with balls forced in teams own in goals resulting in 1 point to the opposition team. Ponsonby claimed that the referee “allowed the game to continue after Newton committed a breach in-goal”, and that they should have been awarded a point. It was decided that if the match was going to have a bearing on the result of the competition then the match would be replayed. Newton went on to win the round after they defeated all 5 opponents.

References

External links 
 

Auckland Rugby League seasons
Auckland Rugby League